Jones Day is an elite American multinational law firm. As of 2021, it was the eighth largest law firm in the United States and the 13th highest grossing law firm in the world. Originally headquartered in Cleveland, Ohio, Jones Day ranks first in both M&A league tables and the 2017 U.S. Law Firm Brand Index. Jones Day has represented over half of the companies in the Fortune 500, including Goldman Sachs, General Motors, McDonald's, and Bridgestone.

Historically, the firm has been a giant in corporate law. Since the 2000s, the firm has become increasingly active in aiding the Republican Party and the American conservative movement. Jones Day was outside counsel for the Trump 2016 and Trump 2020 campaigns. Jones represented former President Donald Trump in lawsuits seeking to stop votes from being counted in the 2020 election. In 2021, Jones Day hired a significant number of former Trump administration lawyers.

History 
Jones Day was founded as Blandin & Rice in 1893 by two partners, Edwin J. Blandin and William Lowe Rice, in Cleveland, Ohio. Frank Ginn joined the firm in 1899, and it changed its name to Blandin, Rice & Ginn. Rice was murdered in August 1910. In 1912, Thomas H. Hogsett joined the firm as partner, and it became Blandin, Hogsett & Ginn that year, and Tolles, Hogsett, Ginn & Morley a year later after the retirement of Judge Blandin and the addition of partners Sheldon H. Tolles and John C. Morley. After Morley retired, in 1928, the firm adopted the name Tolles, Hogsett & Ginn.

In its early years, the firm was known for representing major industries in the Cleveland area, including Standard Oil and several railroad and utility companies.

In November 1938, then-managing partner Thomas Jones led the merger of Tolles, Hogsett & Ginn with litigation-focused firm Day, Young, Veach & LeFever to create Jones, Day, Cockley & Reavis. The merger was effective January 1, 1939. The firm's Washington, D.C., office was opened in 1946, becoming the firm's first office outside Ohio. In 1967, the firm merged with D.C. firm Pogue & Neal to become Jones, Day, Reavis & Pogue.

International expansion
The international expansion of Jones Day began in 1986 when the firm merged with boutique law firm Surrey & Morse, a firm of 75 attorneys with international offices in New York City, Paris, London, and Washington, D.C. The following years the firm expanded to Hong Kong, Brussels, Tokyo, Taipei, and Frankfurt.

Union-busting 
Jones Day has a reputation for representing companies against labor unions.

Republican Party and conservative politics 
Whereas Jones Day has historically focused on corporate law, they increasingly shifted to aiding the Republican Party and the American conservative movement from the 2000s onwards. This shift began when Stephen Brogan became managing partner of Jones Day in 2003. Subsequently, the firm increasingly took on ideologically charged cases and causes. During the Barack Obama administration, Jones Day challenged the constitutionality of the Affordable Care Act and the Consumer Financial Protection Bureau. 

During the Donald Trump administration, Jones Day helped the administration to dismantle the administrative state, combat early voting, and place a citizenship question on the census. The firm provided services to Donald Trump for his personal legal problems, as well as helped the Donald Trump 2016 campaign amid investigations into Russian interference in the 2016 election. This defense included trying to control which documents to hand over to investigators and which staff members to make available for interviews.

Jones Day partner Don McGahn, who was previously a member of the Federal Election Commission, served as counsel for the 2016 Donald Trump presidential campaign and was later nominated to serve as Trump's White House Counsel. As of March 2017, at least 14 Jones Day attorneys had been appointed to work for the Trump administration.

Jones Day was outside counsel for the Trump 2016 and Trump 2020 campaigns. From 2015 to November 2020, Jones Day received more than $20 million in fees from the Trump campaigns. Jones Day earned more than $4.5 million for Trump 2020 campaign work between January 1, 2019 and August 31, 2020.

In 2020, Jones Day was hired by Trump in his legal fight to challenge the results of the 2020 presidential election, which he lost to Joe Biden. The firm worked for Trump in trying to have courts toss out Pennsylvania mail votes. According to the New York Times, Jones Day "was giving voice — and legal backing — to the president’s unsubstantiated fear-mongering about the possibility of an election tainted by fraud." However, the firm said it "is not representing President Trump, his campaign, or any affiliated party in any litigation alleging voter fraud." Jones Day also said it "is not representing any entity in any litigation challenging or contesting the results of the 2020 general election" and that "media reports to the contrary are false." According to the New York Times, Jones Day's post-election justifications for its role in the 2020 election "blurred a basic fact: Jones Day and its lawyers were trying to stop votes from being counted, all in an effort to serve the client."

Since then, Jones Day has hired a significant number of former Trump administration lawyers, including Don McGahn and Noel Francisco.

International clientele 
In March 2017, the firm's Munich office was raided in order to obtain confidential client documents held by the firm in relation to its Munich-based Volkswagen emissions scandal internal investigation. The public prosecutor's office seized electronic data and "a large number of paper files" for use in the Brunswick, Germany-based investigation of Volkswagen Group subsidiary Audi AG. German courts upheld the legality of the raid, and no further charges resulted, as of March 2019.

As of 2018, Jones Day's client list includes individuals reported as notably close to Russian mafia, President of Russia Vladimir Putin, his inner circle, and the Kremlin:

Access Industries of Len Blavatnik
Access-Renova Group of Len Blavatnik and Viktor Vekselberg
Alfa-Bank of Pyotr Aven and associated with Richard Burt
Alfa Group of Mikhail Fridman
Alfa-Access-Renova Group (AAR) of Len Blavatnik, Mikhail Fridman, and Viktor Vekselberg
Basic Element of Oleg Deripaska
Sapir Organization of Tamir Sapir and Alex Sapir and an in investor in the Bayrock Group
Eurasian Natural Resources Corporation of "the Trio" of Kazakh businessmen (Alexander Mashkevich, Patokh Chodiev, and Alijan Ibragimov)
LetterOne of Mikhail Fridman
National Rifle Association associated with Maria Butina and Alexander Torshin
Renova Group of Viktor Vekselberg
Rosneft of Igor Sechin
Russian Standard Group of Roustam Tariko
Sukhoi Civil Aircraft Corporation in which Semion Mogilevich is an investment

Operations 

As of 2018, Jones Day was the fifth largest law firm in the U.S. and the 13th highest grossing law firm in the world.

Compensation 
The firm compensates each associate (after their first year) uniquely, based on the quality of their work and jurisdiction. Unlike many peer firms, Jones Day does not pay a year-end or mid-year bonus, compensating associates entirely with salary; salaries are not public and are not determined by class-year, and the firm has long said that its "black box" compensation system breeds collegiality, and that its associates—even though they are not paid a bonus—generally earn the same as, or more than, associates at other major firms. New associates have a starting salary of US$225,000. Some associates have said that they are under-compensated compared to their peers at other firms, sometimes by tens of thousands of dollars, and that their compensation is much lower than what they were promised when they interviewed.

Notable cases 
The firm's attorneys have argued more than 40 cases before the United States Supreme Court. Some of the firm's notable cases include:

 The firm represented the North American Coal Corporation in a legal challenge to the Environmental Protection Agency's rule-making power under the Clean Air Act (West Virginia v. EPA).
 The firm represented the Alabama Association of Realtors in a successful legal challenge to the Center for Disease Control's nationwide eviction moratorium (Alabama Association of Realtors v. Department of Health and Human Services). The CDC eviction moratorium covered approximately 30-40 million renters at risk of eviction.
 The firm represented the Arizona Republican Party in Brnovich v. Democratic National Committee. Jones Day successfully defended against the DNC's legal challenge to Arizona voting laws that had a disparate impact on racial minorities.
 The firm submitted a brief of amicus curiae on behalf of its client Chevron in Nestle v. Doe, a 2020 case raised the pleading requirements for plaintiffs stating a claim under the Alien Tort Statute.

Gender discrimination suit 
In 2019, six plaintiffs, who were former Jones Day Associates, filed a gender discrimination lawsuit against the firm in Washington DC federal court. The plaintiffs alleged unfair pay between female and male associates at the firm. Jones Day denied the allegations made by the plaintiffs and each of the plaintiffs ultimately dropped the claims after review of the firm's payroll data did not support class-wide claims of gender discrimination.

Leak of files 
In January 2021 hackers leaked files belonging to Jones Day in a ransomware attack. When Jones Day failed to cater to their demands the hacker posted dozens of gigabytes of data on a dark web site. Jones Day denies that any of its own servers were compromised and blamed the loss of data on a larger hack of Accellion. The files were republished and made available to journalists by Distributed Denial of Secrets.

Notable alumni 
 Marvin Bower, McKinsey & Co. consultant
 James Brokenshire, Northern Ireland Secretary under Prime Minister Theresa May
 Timothy Dyk, judge for the United States Court of Appeals for the Federal Circuit
 Noel Francisco, former United States Solicitor General in the Donald Trump administration
 Benjamin Ginsberg, lawyer
 Erwin Griswold, former United States Solicitor General and Harvard Law School Dean
 Jane Harman, former U.S. Congresswoman
 Justin Herdman, United States Attorney for the Northern District of Ohio
 Gregory Katsas, judge for the United States Court of Appeals for the D.C. Circuit
 Megyn Kelly, journalist
 Donald McGahn, former White House Counsel in the Donald Trump administration
 Carmen Guerricagoitia McLean, associate judge on the Superior Court of the District of Columbia
 Eric E. Murphy, judge for the United States Court of Appeals for the Sixth Circuit
 Chaka Patterson, fundraiser for Barack Obama and Hillary Clinton, former Chief of the Cook County State's Attorney's Office, Civil Division
 L. Welch Pogue, former Chairman of the Civil Aeronautics Board
 Chad Readler, judge for the United States Court of Appeals for the Sixth Circuit
 Antonin Scalia, former Supreme Court Associate Justice
 Jeffrey Sutton, judge for the United States Court of Appeals for the Sixth Circuit

Notes

References

External links

Law firms established in 1893
1893 establishments in Ohio
Privately held companies of the United States
Foreign law firms with offices in Hong Kong
Foreign law firms with offices in Japan
Foreign law firms with offices in the Netherlands
Law firms based in Cleveland